American Hollow is a 1999 American documentary film directed and produced by Rory Kennedy. The film follows the extended Bowling family, residents of an eastern Kentucky valley, for a year in Perry County, Kentucky. The music for the film was composed by Bill Frisell.

Iree Bowling died at the age of 81 in December 2010.

Cast
 Bascum Bowling
 Clint Bowling
 Edgar Bowling
 Samantha Bowling
 Iree Bowling
 Samantha Bowling

References

External links
 

1990s English-language films
1999 films
1999 documentary films
Films shot in Kentucky
Documentary films about Kentucky
Perry County, Kentucky
1990s American films